Lesbian, gay, bisexual, and transgender (LGBT) people in Sergipe, Brazil enjoy many of the same legal protections available to non-LGBT people. Homosexuality is legal in the state.

Laws against discrimination
Sergipe was among the first states in Brazil to enact a state constitution banning discrimination on the basis of sexual orientation, doing so in 1989 alongside Mato Grosso do Sul.

Same-sex marriage
On 5 July 2012, Brazilian State's Judiciary Power of Sergipe issued "Provimento nº 06/2012" regulating same-sex marriage throughout the State.

References

Sergipe
Sergipe